Vietnam Colony is a 1992 Indian Malayalam-language comedy drama film written and directed by Siddique-Lal. It stars Mohanlal, Innocent, Kanaka, and K. P. A. C. Lalitha. The soundtrack of the film was composed by S. Balakrishnan. The film achieved considerable success following its theatrical release and became the first highest-grossing of the year. A Tamil remake of the film was released in 1994 with the same title. The film is based on the 1983 Scottish film Local Hero.

Plot
 
G. Krishnamoorthy, who hails from a respectable Tamil Brahmin community, gets a job with the Calcutta Construction Company as a construction supervisor. He is really excited about this until his new colleague, K. K. Joseph, persuades him not to take the job. He tells Krishnamoorthy that their job is to vacate the infamous Vietnam Colony, a poor colony inhabited by day labourers, of its residents so that the building company can clear the land for construction. Joseph adds on the fact that the company has been trying to vacate the residents for years, but it has failed due to the efforts of three criminal leaders: Paravoor Ravuthar, Irumbu John and Kannappa Srank. Adding insult to injury, Joseph remarks that Krishnamoorthy is too weak to stay there and take on the criminals due to his sensitive Brahmin mannerisms. Krishnamoorthy decides that Joseph is right; the job is too dangerous for them.

Later that evening, Krishnamoorthy confronts his mother and tells her that he will be rejecting the job offer. However, his strong-willed mother won't let him free that easily. Moreover, Krishnamoorthy's relatives, whom his late father borrowed money from, demand their money back from Krishnamoorthy and threaten him if he doesn't take the job. His circumstances leave him no choice but to accept the offer.

Krishnamoorthy talks to his boss and the company lawyer, Advocate Thomas. They decide to utilize Krishnamoorthy's background in drama by making him and Joseph pose as harmless writers who want to document colony life so that they can destroy the colony from within. They also have made arrangements for the duo to stay at Pattalam Madhavi's house.

The next day, the duo arrives at the colony and finds the house. However, upon the advice of Erumely, the broker, Madhavi mistakes Krishnamoorthy as a marriage proposal for her daughter, Unni, who takes a liking to Krishnamoorthy immediately. Krishnamoorthy is not used to the new way of living, especially being so close with a girl, so everyone chides him and calls him Swami. Krishnamoorthy becomes annoyed at first, but he accepts his new nickname.

Over time, Swami befriends the colony members and tries to get an overview of the situation. He finds out that the proprietor is a man named Moosa Settu and that his mentally ill mother, Suhra Bai, lives in the colony. He wins Suhra Bai's trust with his kindness and compassion. Suhra Bai tells Swami that Moosa Settu took her money and drove her out due to his greed, and left the colony in shambles. Moreover, she knows that the criminal leaders demand monthly payments from the colony's residents so that they don't kill anyone. Swami realizes that the colony members aren't so bad after all, so he tries to help them a little bit by improving the infrastructure of the colony. He gains the trust of the colony residents and even the gangsters. Swami becomes confident that he can relocate the colony peacefully.

Swami begins his plan by striking a deal with his bosses to give the colony residents a large amount of land with houses to which they can relocate, and puts up a show of negotiation in front of the colony to make them agree to the plan. In a large pep talk, he convinces the colony that they can get whatever they want if they are united. 
In the least unexpected time, Suhra Bai becomes adamant, saying that she cannot leave the land that she inherited from her father. Ravuthar kicks her in a fit of rage, and she dies the next day. Swami sets out to find Moosa Settu to perform his mother's last rites. To Swami's surprise, he finds Advocate Thomas living in Moosa Settu's bungalow. Even more surprising, he finds the now homeless Moosa Settu at the local madrasa and makes him perform his mother's last rites.

Swami realizes that the company that he works for is trying to illegally demolish the land. However, his timing fell a little short; the colony finds out that Swami was on the company's side, and tries to oust him. Swami confesses and vows to fight for the colony's justice. Unni admires Swami's bravery and slowly falls in love with him. The goons are now on the company's side, as they have been asked to vacate the colony in exchange for a large sum of money. In the end, Swami fights down Ravuthar, and keeps the colony intact.

Cast

 Mohanlal as G. Krishnamurthy
 Innocent as K. K. Joseph
 Kanaka as Unnimol
 Devan as Advocate Thomas
 Vijaya Rangaraju as Rawther (voice Dubbed By N. F. Varghese )
 Jagannatha Varma as Company MD
 K. P. A. C. Lalitha as Pattalam Madhavi Amma
 Nedumudi Venu as Moosa Settu
 Kuthiravattam Pappu as Erumeli
 Vijayaraghavan as Vattappalli
 Bheeman Raghu as Irumpu John
 Philomina as Suhra Bai, Moosa Settu's elderly mother
 Kaviyoor Ponnamma as Parvathiyammal, Krishnamurthy's mother
 T. P. Madhavan as Sivaraman Krishnamurthy's maternal uncle
 Kunchan as Pattabhiraman, Sivaraman's son and Krishnamurthy's cousin
 Sankaradi as Insane Man
 Santhakumari as Colony woman
 T. R. Omana as Krishnamoorthy's aunt
 Priyanka Anoop as Colony Girl
 James as Colony man
 Manju Satheesh as Colony girl
 Radhika as Krishnamoorthy's Niece

Production
Vietnam Colony was produced and distributed by Swargachitra Appachan under the banner of Swargachitra, co-produced by Joy for President Movies. The film was shot in Alappuzha, and Kalpathy in Kerala. In 2017, actor Jayasurya revealed that he came to the filming location in Alappuzha as a junior artist, but was not recruited as the preference was for the local people in Alappuzha.

Box office
The movie was a commercial success. It was the
second highest grosser of 1992

Soundtrack 

The film's soundtrack contains six songs, all composed by S. Balakrishnan and lyrics by Bichu Thirumala.

Reception
The movie was extremely well received and became a critical and commercial success. The technical aspects of the movie were well appreciated. 
Dialogues such as "Ithalla, ithinapporum chaadi kadannavananee K.K Joseph!" and many others still find their way into the daily conversation of Malayalees.

Awards

 Kerala State Film Awards
 Best Art Director - Mani Suchitra

 Kerala Film Chamber Award
 Best Supporting Actress - K. P. A. C. Lalitha
 Best Female Playback Singer - Minmini

References

External links
 

1990s Malayalam-language films
1992 films
1992 comedy-drama films
Malayalam films remade in other languages
Films shot in Alappuzha
Films shot in Palakkad
Indian comedy-drama films
Films directed by Siddique–Lal